The Prague Canoeing Centre is one of the most frequently used venues for international canoe slalom competition.  Built in 1983 in Czechoslovakia, it diverts water around a  dam at Troja on the Vltava river in Prague. Its two unique features are its use of car and truck tires as flow diverters and its shallow slope, closer to 1% than the usual nearly 2% for such venues. Despite these characteristics, the Troja facility has hosted ten World Cup races and one World Championship in the 21 years 1992–2012, and the 2013 World Championships.

Venue

The channel walls are vertical, with flow diverters constructed of automobile and truck tires stacked side by side to form large cylinders attached to the bottom by beams running through the tires.  Large truck tires are used at the channel sides, where they often breach the surface.  In the center of the flow are smaller automobile tires which remain submerged, and shallow-sloped ramps.  In several spots, new concrete platforms have been installed in the channel bed to receive moveable RapidBlocs, like the ones at the Lee Valley White Water Centre used for the London 2012 Summer Olympics.  

There are four wing dams on the right and five on the left.  At the location of the mid-course bridge, two wing dams are directly across from each other, narrowing the channel by one third.  Just below the bridge is a concrete boulder in the channel center, connected to the right bank by a barrier that blocks all flow to the right, effectively narrowing the channel by half.

2013 World Championship gates

2012 World Cup gates

References

Artificial whitewater courses
Sport in Prague